Hermina Geyser (born 4 February 1938) is a South African athlete. She competed in the women's high jump at the 1956 Summer Olympics.

References

External links
 

1938 births
Living people
Athletes (track and field) at the 1956 Summer Olympics
South African female high jumpers
Olympic athletes of South Africa
People from Pietermaritzburg